The Holme (Saxon: "river island") is a mansion located on Inner Circle by Regent's Park in the City of Westminster, London, England. It was designed by Decimus Burton, as a residence for the Burton family, and built in 1818, by the company of James Burton, who subsequently lived there. It has been described as 'one of the most desirable private homes in London' by architectural scholar Guy Williams. Architectural critic Ian Nairn wrote of the house, "If you want a definition of western civilization in a single view, then here it is".

The Holme was the second villa to be built in Regent's Park, and the first of those to be designed or constructed by the Burton family. The house consists of two storeys above ground, as well as offices contained in a basement. The entrance is under an Ionic-style portico and pediments. It has a bow or rotunda decorated by four columns; the bow is surmounted by an attic, and is covered with a well-proportioned cupola. Renovations occurred in 1911 with the addition of wings by Bertie Crewe and again in 1935 when a balustrade replaced an existing dome.

References

Bibliography

 

Buildings and structures in Regent's Park
Houses completed in 1818
Decimus Burton buildings
James Burton (property developer) buildings
Grade II* listed buildings in the City of Westminster
Grade II* listed houses
Houses in the City of Westminster
Regent's Park